Ahmad Mayez Khanji (born 22 June 1967) is a Syrian boxer. He competed in the men's light welterweight event at the 1988 Summer Olympics. At the 1988 Summer Olympics, he lost to Lars Myrberg of Sweden.

References

1967 births
Living people
Syrian male boxers
Olympic boxers of Syria
Boxers at the 1988 Summer Olympics
Place of birth missing (living people)
Asian Games medalists in boxing
Boxers at the 1990 Asian Games
Asian Games gold medalists for Syria
Medalists at the 1990 Asian Games
Light-welterweight boxers
20th-century Syrian people